Berg is a municipality in the district of Ahrweiler, in Rhineland-Palatinate, Germany.

The municipality consists of the following villages: Berg, Freisheim, Krälingen, Häselingen, Vellen and Vischel.

References

Populated places in Ahrweiler (district)